The 1967 World Open Snooker Championship was a series of 51 matches between Fred Davis and Rex Williams for the title won by Davis at the 1960 World Open Snooker Championship. Despite the name of the competition, Davis and Williams were the only contestants. Williams took the title by winning 26 matches to Davis' 25, a winning margin having been achieved at 26–23.

Summary
Fred Davis had won the 1960 World Open Snooker Championship, which had been held in Australia with eight players competing in a round-robin. Davis and Rex Williams arranged to play a series of 31 matches with the winner taking the title, and with each player taking a fee from each of the match venues. Snooker historian Clive Everton has suggested that the agenda behind the contest was to allow Williams to gain a world snooker title and become more marketable, at a time when he was unlikely to win against the reigning world champion John Pulman. Everton claims that Davis remarked "I had a devil of a job to let him win."

All matches were of five .
Originally there were going to be 31 matches in the series, but this was later extended to 51.

Davis won the first three matches, before Williams had his first win in the fourth match. These were played in front of capacity crowds at each venue. Williams later levelled at 5–5, with Davis then winning three of the next five matches to lead 8–7 by Christmas 1966. After the resumption of the series in January 1967, Williams won two matches to take the lead for the first time, at 9–8, but then lost the next three to trail 9–11, before winning four in succession to lead 13–11. With the pair each obtaining four wins from the next eight matches, Williams led 17–16. Thirteen matches later, Williams had increased his lead to 25–21, needing only one further win out of the remaining five matches.

Williams reached a winning margin at British Sidac, St. Helens, to win the title at 26–23. Davis won the last two matches to make the final score 26–25. Williams was presented with the trophy by Harold Phillips, Chairman of the Billiards Association and Control Council, after the final match, which was held at Ferranti Recreation, Manchester.

Known match details

References

1966 in snooker
1967 in snooker
1966 in British sport
1967 in British sport